Július Šupler (born 27 October 1950 in Poprad, Czechoslovakia) is a Slovak ice-hockey coach. Šupler has been coach of HC Dukla Trenčín and Riga 2000 and was the first coach of Slovakia national team.

Playing career
Šupler began playing ice hockey in his hometown of Poprad and later played in Liptovský Mikuláš. In 1970–1972 he played for Slovan Bratislava and in  1972–1976 for VSŽ Košice.

Coaching career

He started coaching as the assistant coach in Poprad 1979–1985, as the head coach in 1985–1987. In 1991–92 season he won Czechoslovakia title with Dukla Trenčín. Since 1993 he was the head coach of Slovakia national team. He led Slovakia to the A-category of IIHF World Championship in the least possible time, by winning the C-category in 1994 and B-category in 1995. He led the Slovakian team also to sixth place at the 1994 Olympic Tournament in Lillehammer. After the 1996 World Championships in Vienna, where Slovakia obtained 10th place, his contract with the Slovak national team was not extended.

In 1996–2006 he was coaching various teams—the Portland Winterhawks in WHL, Slovan Bratislava, and HK Riga 2000 (Latvia).

In 2006 he again became the coach of the Slovak national team. He chose Zdeno Cíger and Miroslav Miklošovič for his assistants, replacing Cíger with Peter Oremus in June 2007. Under his coaching, Slovakia obtained sixth spot at 2007 World Championships and 13th place at 2008. After the 2008 championship, he was replaced by Ján Filc.

He was the head coach of HC Donbass in 2012-13.

References 

1950 births
Slovak ice hockey coaches
Dinamo Riga coaches
Sportspeople from Poprad
Living people
Slovak expatriate sportspeople in Ukraine
Slovakia men's national ice hockey team coaches
Czechoslovak ice hockey forwards
Slovak ice hockey forwards
Slovak expatriate sportspeople in the United States
Slovak expatriate sportspeople in the Czech Republic
Slovak expatriate sportspeople in Russia
Slovak expatriate sportspeople in Belarus
Slovak expatriate ice hockey people
Slovak expatriate sportspeople in Latvia
Czechoslovak ice hockey coaches
HK Poprad players
HC Košice players